The third season of the Australian drama television series Love Child, began airing on 20 June 2016 and concluded on 1 August 2016 on the Nine Network. The season consisted of ten episodes airing on Monday evenings at 8:30 pm.

Cast

Main

 Jessica Marais as Joan Millar
 Jonathan LaPaglia as Dr Patrick McNaughton
 Matthew Le Nevez as Jim Marsh
 Mandy McElhinney as Matron Frances Bolton
 Ella Scott Lynch as Shirley Ryan
 Harriet Dyer as Patricia Saunders
 Sophie Hensser as Viv Maguire
 Gracie Gilbert as Annie Carmichael
 Miranda Tapsell as Martha Tennant

Recurring

 Andrew Ryan as Dr Simon Bowditch
 Lincoln Younes as Chris
 Maya Stange as Eva
 Tiarnie Coupland as Maggie
 Jeremy Lindsay Taylor as Leon

Episodes

References

2016 Australian television seasons